Mia Löjdahl (born 20 May 1973) is a retired Swedish professional golfer. She won the 1994 European Lady Junior's Team Championship, topped the Swedish Golf Tour Order of Merit in 1995 as an amateur, and played on the Ladies European Tour six seasons 1997–2002.

Amateur career
Löjdahl successfully played on the National Team and won silver at the inaugural European Girls' Team Championship in 1991 together with Anna Berg, Charlotta Sörenstam and Maria Hjorth. She won the 1994 European Lady Junior's Team Championship at Gutenhof GC in Austria, with Pia Nilsson coaching a team consisting of Anna Berg, Charlotta Sörenstam, Maria Hjorth, Linda Ericsson and Helena Olsson. She also represented Sweden at the 1995 European Ladies' Team Championship in Italy where her team finished 7th under captain Pia Nilsson, and at the 1996 Espirito Santo Trophy at St Elena in the Philippines where she finished 7th together with Anna Berg and Sara Eklund.

Löjdahl played on the Swedish Golf Tour as an amateur 1994–1996. She recorded three victories in 1995, topping the Order of Merit, but was ineligible for the season award due to her amateur status.

Professional career
Löjdahl turned professional and joined the Ladies European Tour (LET) in 1997. On the LET, she kept her card by comfortably finishing in the top 90 on the Order of Merit each year until 2003. Her top finishes include T7 at the 2000 Marrakech Palmeraie Open, T11 at the 2001 Taiwan Ladies Open, and T8 at the P4 Norwegian Masters in 2002. She also finished T9 at the Malaysia Ladies Open on the 1999 Ladies Asian Golf Tour and was runner-up at the 2000 Ladies Finnish Open. Her only appearance in an LPGA major was at the 2002 Women's British Open at Turnberry.

Löjdahl completed a law degree at Lund University while competing on the LET and was elected to the LET Board of Directors.

Professional wins (5)

Swedish Golf Tour wins (5)

Source:

Results in LPGA majors

Note: Löjdahl only played in the Women's British Open.
CUT = missed the half-way cut

Team appearances
Amateur
European Girls' Team Championship (representing Sweden): 1991
European Lady Junior's Team Championship (representing Sweden): 1994 (winners)
European Ladies' Team Championship (representing Sweden): 1995
Espirito Santo Trophy (representing Sweden): 1996

Source:

Notes

References

External links

Swedish female golfers
Ladies European Tour golfers
Sportspeople from Skåne County
People from Kristianstad Municipality
1973 births
Living people
20th-century Swedish women